"The Man Who Put the Germ in Germany" is a song written in 1918 during World War I. Lyrics and music were composed by Nora Bayes, Sam Downing, and Abe Glatt. Waterson, Berlin & Snyder, Inc. of New York City published the song for both voice and piano. It reached number seven on the US song charts in August 1918.

On the cover of the sheet music is a large picture of Nora Bayes.

The song celebrates America by using word play of famous leaders' names like George Washington and Abraham Lincoln to highlight their achievements. For example, in the chorus:

The use of word play continues throughout the song, even to shine a negative light on Germany and its emperor during World War I, Wilhelm II. The lyrics read:

References

1918 songs
Nora Bayes songs
Songs about Germany
Songs about Wilhelm II
Songs of World War I